Thomas Crimble (20 March 1798 – 1873) was an English cricketer. Crimble was born in Overton, Hampshire.

Crimble represented Hampshire in two first-class matches the first of which came in 1823 against an early England team. During the match he scored his only half century with a score of 52.

His second and final first-class match against Sussex in 1825.

References

External links
Thomas Crimble at Cricinfo
Thomas Crimble at CricketArchive

1798 births
1873 deaths
People from Overton, Hampshire
English cricketers
Hampshire cricketers
English cricketers of 1787 to 1825